Jean Dalli (born 13 August 1976) is an English former footballer who played as a defender in the Football League for Colchester United.

Career

Born in Enfield, London, Dalli joined Colchester United as an apprentice. He made his only first and only professional appearance in a Football League match against Torquay United on 13 August 1994, a game which Colchester lost 3–1. After leaving Colchester, Dalli played for non-league clubs Dover Athletic, Slough Town, Chelmsford City and Baldock Town.

References

1976 births
Living people
Footballers from Enfield, London
English footballers
Association football defenders
Colchester United F.C. players
Dover Athletic F.C. players
Slough Town F.C. players
Chelmsford City F.C. players
Baldock Town F.C. players
English Football League players